Presidential, legislative, and local elections were held on November 8, 1949 in the Philippines. Incumbent President Elpidio Quirino won a full term as President of the Philippines after the death of President Manuel Roxas in 1948. His running mate, Senator Fernando Lopez won as Vice President.  Despite factions created in the administration party, Quirino won a satisfactory vote from the public. It was the only time in Philippine history where the duly elected president, vice president and senators all came from the same party, the Liberal Party.

Results

President

Vice president

Senate

House of Representatives

See also
Commission on Elections
Politics of the Philippines
Philippine elections
President of the Philippines
2nd Congress of the Philippines

References

External links
 The Philippine Presidency Project
 Official website of the Commission on Elections

1949
General election